Ion-Beam sculpting is a two-step process to make solid-state nanopores.  The term itself was coined by Golovchenko and co-workers at Harvard in the paper "Ion-beam sculpting at nanometer length scales."  In the process, solid-state nanopores are formed by lateral mass transport about the surface of the substrate, not simply by sputtering, which is the removal of material from the surface.

Basis
The first step in ion sculpting is to make either a through hole or a blind hole, most commonly using a focused ion beam (FIB).  The holes are commonly ~100 nm, but can be made much smaller.  This step may or may not be done at room temperature, with a low temperature of -120 C.  Next, there are three common techniques to now 'sculpt' the hole: broad area ion exposure, TEM exposure, and FIB exposure.  Holes can be closed completely, but also they can be left open at a lower limit of 1 - 10 nm.

Broad area ion exposure
This technique uses a broad area argon ion source beam.  If the hole is blind (a blind hole is a hole that has not broken through on the backside yet) the wafer (often SiN or silicon/silicon oxide) is then turned upside down, and exposed with the argon beam.  A detector counts the amount of ions passing through the membrane (which should be zero).  The process stops when ions begin to be detected.  This enables for a much smaller hole to be opened than if using an FIB alone.  This method of nanopore fabrication relies on the ion beam to remove (sputter) some of the material from the backside of the sample, revealing part of the hole underneath.

Alternatively, if the hole has already been milled through the substrate, the argon beam is aimed at the wafer, and by lateral mass transport atoms from elsewhere on the wafer move to the edge of the hole.  It is this process of solid-state nanopore fabrication that was originally termed "ion-beam sculpting".  Of paramount importance in this method is the ability to utilize a feedback controlled system to monitor nanopore fabrication in real time.  A detector registers the number of ions passing through the hole as a function of time.  As the hole closes from ~100 nm to its final dimension (>20 nm) the number of ions able to pass through the hole is reduced.  The process is stopped when the final pore size is reached.  If the current drops to zero, then the hole is closed.  This process of nanopore fabrication is used by the labs of Dr. J. Li and J. Golovchenko.  Recently this method has been demonstrated to occur with all the noble gases, not just argon.

TEM exposure
A through hole in a wafer can be closed down by a transmission electron microscope.  Due to hydrocarbon buildup, the electrons stimulate hole closure.  This method is very slow (taking over an hour to close a 100 nm hole).  The slow method allows for great control of the hole size (since you can watch the hole decrease), but its drawback is that it takes a long time. Citation: T.Schenkel, V.Radmilovic, E.A.Stach, S.-J.Park, A.Persaud, J.Va.Sci.Tech.B 21, 2720 (2003).

FIB exposure
This is the easiest of the techniques, but the least useful.  After a hole is milled with an FIB, one can just image the hole (analogous to the TEM technique).  The ions stimulate movement on the wafer, and also implant themselves to help close the hole.  Unlike the other two methods, the holes closed in this technique are not very circular and smooth.  The holes appear jagged under TEM photos.  Also, it is much harder to control the size of the hole to the single nanometer regime.  Another drawback to this technique is that while imaging the hole, the ion beam is continually sputtering membrane material away.  If the beam scan area is large enough, the rate of atoms moving to close the hole will be greater than the rate of sputtering, so the hole will close.  If the membrane is too thin or the scan area too small, then the rate of sputtering will win, and the hole will open up.

An alternative ion beam sculpting technique has been developed using a commercially available FIB system. This sculpting method   can fabricate symmetrically circular nanopores with smooth edge, and, in addition, it can sculpt multiple nanopores of similar shape and size simultaneously. Dependent on the resolution and working condition of the instrument, this method can produce symmetrically shaped nanopores with diameters below 10 nm.

See also
Reactive ion etching

References

Nanotechnology